Beta nana, the dwarf beet, is a species of flowering plant in the family Amaranthaceae, native to the mountains of central and southern Greece. Its resistance to cold has potential in efforts to improve the sugar beet. The plants are small, with rosettes of leaves typically no more than 10 cm across. Flowers are single. Fruit is a hard monogerm seed that contains a single embryo.

References

nana
Endemic flora of Greece
Plants described in 1846